State Highway 21 Rajasthan is an important highway between Jodhpur and Merta City.
State Highways in Rajasthan